The Orange County Water District is a special district that manages the groundwater basin beneath central and northern Orange County, California. The groundwater basin provides a water supply to 19 municipal water agencies and special districts that serve more than 2.4 million Orange County residents. The water district's administrative offices and the Groundwater Replenishment System facilities are located in Fountain Valley, while it also operates various groundwater recharge facilities located in Anaheim and Orange.

History 

The Orange County Water District was formed by an act of the California State Legislature in 1933.  The District Act was signed on June 14 of that year by Governor James Rolph, Jr.

The Orange County Water District was designated as an Orange County Historical Civil Engineering Landmark in 2006.

Facilities

Groundwater Replenishment System 

The Groundwater Replenishment System takes highly treated wastewater from the Orange County Sanitation District and purifies it using microfiltration, reverse osmosis and ultraviolet light with hydrogen peroxide.  This produces high-quality water that exceeds state and federal drinking water standards.  The GWRS has been operational since January 2008 and initially produced up to 70 million gallons of water daily. After the completion of an upgrade in 2015, the plant produced 100 million gallons per day with an expansion to provide up to 130 million approved on September 21, 2016.

The Orange County Water and Sanitation Districts were awarded the Stockholm Industry Water Award in 2008 for pioneering work to develop the Groundwater Replenishment System, the world’s largest water purification plant for groundwater recharge.

Groundwater recharge facilities 

The Orange County Water District operates groundwater recharge facilities in the Cities of Anaheim and Orange. A 30-year lease agreement was approved in January 2013 to allow the district to construct an injection water well and well facilities at the Anaheim Regional Transportation Intermodal Center.

Facilities in Anaheim 

 Anaheim Lake
 Burris Basin
Crescent Basin
 Conrock Basin
 Five Coves Basin
Gilbert Basin
 Huckleberry Basin
 Kraemer Basin
 La Jolla Basin
 La Palma Basin
 Lincoln Basin
 Miller Basin
 Mills Pond
 Miraloma Basin
 Olive Basin
 Placentia Basin
 Raymond Basin 
 Warner Basin

Facilities in Orange 
 Fletcher Basin
 Riverview Basin
 Santiago Basins (Diamond and Bond Pits)

Other facilities 
 Prado wetlands
 Seawater barrier

Member agencies and cities 
There are 19 city water departments and water districts that are member agencies of the Orange County Water Dsitrict and pump groundwater from the basin.

 City of Anaheim
 City of Buena Park
 East Orange County Water District
 City of Fountain Valley
 City of Fullerton
 City of Garden Grove
 Golden State Water Company
 City of Huntington Beach
 Irvine Ranch Water District
 City of La Palma
 Mesa Water District 
 City of Newport Beach Water Department
 City of Orange
 City of Santa Ana Municipal Services
 City of Seal Beach
 Serrano Water District
 City of Tustin
 City of Westminster
 Yorba Linda Water District

Governance 
The Orange County Water District is governed by a ten-member board of directors.  Seven are publicly elected and three are appointed by the city councils of Anaheim, Fullerton, and Santa Ana, respectively. The board is responsible for the district's policies and decision making.

See also
 Groundwater recharge
 Reclaimed water
 Santa Ana River
 Water in California

References

External links 
 Orange County Water District website
 Groundwater Replenishment System

Government in Orange County, California
Water management authorities in California
Santa Ana River
1933 establishments in California
Government agencies established in 1933
Buildings and structures in Orange County, California